Corentin Jean (born 15 July 1995) is a French professional footballer who plays as a striker for Major League Soccer club Inter Miami. Besides France, he has played in the United States.

Club career

Troyes
Born in Blois, France, Jean made his full debut for Troyes in the Coupe de la Ligue against Rennes. He immediately made an impact with scoring his first professional goal for the club. However, after a late-minute goal from Romain Alessandrini Stade Rennais finally won the game with 2–1. He scored just two minutes after goal-scoring Jean was replaced for Mohamed Yattara.

Monaco
On 2 July 2015, Jean signed for Monaco. He was loaned out to Troyes for the 2015–16 Ligue 1 season.

Toulouse
Jean signed for Toulouse for the 2016–17 Ligue 1 season on loan, he later joined them on a permanent transfer the following season.

Lens
On 1 January 2020, Jean signed for Lens on loan for the season of the 2019–20 Ligue 2 season with an option to buy in the summer. He made his debut on 18 January 2020 against Guingamp in Ligue 2. He was subbed on for Tony Mauricio in the 66th minute. On 6 June 2020, Jean completed a permanent transfer to Lens, for a fee of €1 million. He signed a three-year contract.

Inter Miami 
On 29 June 2022, Jean signed for Major League Soccer club Inter Miami on a contract until the end of the 2024 season, with club options for the 2025 and 2026 seasons.

Career statistics

Honours
Troyes
Ligue 2: 2014–15
Monaco

 Ligue 1: 2016–17

References

External links
 Eurosport profile
 
 

1995 births
Living people
Sportspeople from Blois
Association football forwards
French footballers
ES Troyes AC players
AS Monaco FC players
Toulouse FC players
RC Lens players
Inter Miami CF players
Ligue 1 players
Ligue 2 players
Championnat National 2 players
Championnat National 3 players
Major League Soccer players
France youth international footballers
France under-21 international footballers
French expatriate sportspeople in Monaco
Expatriate footballers in Monaco
Footballers from Centre-Val de Loire
French expatriate sportspeople in the United States
Expatriate soccer players in the United States